Blo.Torch is a Dutch melodic death metal band from The Hague. Freely mixing genres, their style has also been described as black metal. Formed by Marvin Vriesde and Hassan Moechtar in 1996, they got their first big break when their debut demo titled "The Plot Sickens..." got a great review in Terrorizer magazine, which caught the eye of Earache Records label manager Dan Tobin. After contacting the band and listening to more material, he offered BloTorch a record deal with Earache sublabel Wicked World Records. Blo.Torch released their self titled debut album on Wicked World in 1999. Blo.Torch and Wicked World parted ways in 2001.

In the next years, Blo.Torch recorded two more demos and parted ways with vocalist Michel de Wilde, who was succeeded by Chris van der Valk. In 2004, Blo.Torch entered the prestigious regional talent competition, De Grote Prijs van Zuid-Holland (The Grand Prize of South Holland) in 2004., which they won. Winning the regional leg granted them a place in the national finals, De Grote Prijs van Nederland (The Grand Prize of The Netherlands), but did not win.

Still unsigned, the band released another full length album titled "Volatile" in 2004. In 2005, guitarist Marvin Vriesde left the band to focus on his other band, Severe Torture. Vriesde was succeeded by Rory Hansen. 

October 2006, Blo.Torch played their last show in De Baroeg, Rotterdam. 

The band released another full length album, Volatile, Currently unsigned, they had been signed with Earache Records, and have released two full-length albums.

Overview
The founding members, Hassan Moechtar and Marvin Vriesde were quickly joined by Sander Koole (formerly with Cypher). After a demo, they recorded an eponymous album, which was picked up by Wicked World, a sublabel of Earache Records, who signed the band in 2000. Quickly, however, the band complained about lack of support, and recorded and released the follow-up, Volatile, independently. Since recording that album, the band has played smaller festivals and venues in the Netherlands.

In July 2005, Vriesde left the band (he is also active in Dew-Scented) and was replaced by Rory Hansen, formerly of Bagga Bownz. The band's website announced in 2006 that Sander Koole, longtime bassist for the band, left to pursue other musical interests. Since 7 October 2006, the band's website has not been updated.

Members

Current members 
Hassan Moechtar - guitar
Rory Hansen - guitar
Pascal Rappailles - drums
Chris van der Valk - vocals

Past members 
Sander Koole - bass
John den Buitelaar- Drums
Michel de Wilde - vocals
Marvin Vriesde - guitar

Discography 
The Plot Sickens... (Demo, 1997)
Blo.Torch (Album, Wicked World/Earache, 1999)
Demo 2001 (Demo, 2001)
Plan B (Promo CD, 2002)
Volatile (Album, 2004)

References

External links 
Official site 
Myspace page
Blo.Torch on Satan Stoly My Teddybear
Blo.Torch news on VPRO
Blo.Torch on Muziek Centrum Nederland

Dutch melodic death metal musical groups
Musical groups established in 1996
Earache Records artists
Musical quartets